Helen Fry (born 1967) is a British historian, lecturer and biographer, with especial reference to the Second World War.

Early life
Helen Fry was born in Ilfracombe, North Devon. She graduated with a B.A. Hons and Ph.D. from the University of Exeter in 1996.

Career
During the 1990s, she was active on the international stage in the youth movement of The Council of Christians and Jews, and in promoting inter-faith relations. She has written over 20 books, with special expertise on the 10,000 German-speaking refugees who served in the British forces during the Second World War, especially the Royal Pioneer Corps.

She is an Honorary Research Fellow in the Dept of Hebrew & Jewish Studies at University College London and Honorary member of The Association of Jewish Refugees. She teaches at the London Jewish Cultural Centre. Reviewer Martin Rubin described her book Freud's War as taking readers into the "unusual corners of global conflicts" and described her book as a detailed portrait of different military experiences during World War II.

Personal life
Fry lives in north London.

Selected publications
The King's Most Loyal Enemy Aliens (Sutton, 2007). Republished in paperback as Churchill's German Army (The History Press, 2010).
Music & Men: The Life and Loves of Harriet Cohen (The History Press, 2009).
Freud's War (The History Press, 2009).
The M Room (self-published on Amazon, 2013).
The London Cage: The Secret History of Britain's WWII Interrogation Centre (Yale University Press, 2017)
MI9: A History of the Secret Service for Escape and Evasion in World War II (Yale University Press, 2020)
Spymaster: The Man who Saved MI6 (Yale University Press, 2021)

References 

1967 births
Living people
English historians
English biographers
British women historians
English women non-fiction writers
Women biographers